In mathematics, an involute (also known as an evolvent) is a particular type of curve that is dependent on another shape or curve. An involute of a curve is the locus of a point on a piece of taut string as the string is either unwrapped from or wrapped around the curve.

The evolute of an involute is the original curve.

It is generalized by the roulette family of curves. That is, the involutes of a curve are the roulettes of the curve generated by a straight line.

The notions of the involute and evolute of a curve were introduced by Christiaan Huygens in his work titled Horologium oscillatorium sive de motu pendulorum ad horologia aptato demonstrationes geometricae (1673), where he showed that the involute of a cycloid is still a cycloid, thus providing a method for constructing the cycloidal pendulum, which has the useful property that its period is independent of the amplitude of oscillation.

Involute of a parameterized curve 

is an involute of the given curve.

Hence, the involute can be varied by constant  and/or adding a number to the integral (see Involutes of a semicubic parabola).

If  one gets

Properties of involutes 

One gets for the involute:

 and

and the statement: 
At point   the involute is not regular (because  ),
and from   follows:
 The normal of the involute at point  is the tangent of the given curve at point .
The family of involutes and the family of tangents to the original curve makes up an orthogonal coordinate system. Consequently, one may construct involutes graphically. First, draw the family of tangent lines. Then, an involute can be constructed by always staying orthogonal to the tangent line passing the point.

Cusps 
This section is based on.

There are generically two types of cusps in involutes. The first type is at the point where the involute touches the curve itself. This is a cusp of order 3/2. The second type is at the point where the curve has an inflection point. This is a cusp of order 5/2.

This maps the 2D plane into a surface in 3D space. For example, this maps the circle into the hyperboloid of one sheet.

Generically, the surface has vertical tangent planes at only two cases: where the surface touches the curve, and where the curve has an inflection point.

cusp of order 3/2 

For the first type, one can start by the involute of a circle, with equationthen set , and expand for small , to obtainthus giving the order 3/2 curve , a semicubical parabola.

cusp of order 5/2 
For the second type, consider the curve . Explicitly, one may solve for the polynomial expansion satisfied by :or which clearly shows the cusp shape.

Examples

Involutes of a circle 

For a circle with parametric representation , one has
.

Evaluating the above given equation of the involute, one gets

for the parametric equation of the involute of the circle.

The  term is optional; it serves to set the start location of the curve on the circle. The involutes look like Archimedean spirals, but they are actually not.

Involutes of a semicubic parabola 
The parametric equation  describes a semicubical parabola. Extending the string by   extensively simplifies further calculation, and one gets
 

Eliminating   yields  showing that this involute is a parabola. 

The other involutes are thus parallel curves of a parabola, and are not parabolas, as they are curves of degree six (See ).

Involutes of a catenary 
Thus the arc length from the point  is  

 
and is thus a tractrix.

The other involutes are not tractrices, as they are parallel curves of a tractrix.

Involutes of a cycloid 

The parametric representation  describes a cycloid. From , one gets (after having used some trigonometric formulas)
 
and 
 

Hence the equations of the corresponding involute are
 
 
which describe the shifted red cycloid of the diagram. Hence

 The involutes of the cycloid  are parallel curves of the cycloid 
 
(Parallel curves of a cycloid are not cycloids.)

Involute and evolute 
Between involutes and evolutes the following statement holds:

A curve is the evolute of any of its involutes.

Application
The most common profiles of modern gear teeth are involutes of a circle. In an involute gear system the teeth of two meshing gears contact at a single instantaneous point that follows along a single straight line of action. The forces exerted the contacting teeth exert on each other also follow this line, and are normal to the teeth. The involute gear system maintaining these conditions follows the fundamental law of gearing: the ratio of angular velocities between the two gears must remain constant throughout.

With teeth of other shapes, the relative speeds and forces rise and fall as successive teeth engage, resulting in vibration, noise, and excessive wear. For this reason, nearly all modern planar gear systems are either involute or the related cycloidal gear system.

The involute of a circle is also an important shape in gas compressing, as a scroll compressor can be built based on this shape. Scroll compressors make less sound than conventional compressors and have proven to be quite efficient.

The High Flux Isotope Reactor uses involute-shaped fuel elements, since these allow a constant-width channel between them for coolant.

See also
 Envelope (mathematics)
 Evolute
 Goat grazing problem
 Involute gear
 Roulette (curve)
 Scroll compressor

References

External links
Involute at MathWorld

Differential geometry
Roulettes (curve)